Yang Zhou (born 21 April 1992, in Zhejiang) is a female Chinese volleyball player. She won the 2013 FIVB Women's U23 Volleyball World Championship.

Clubs
  Zhejiang New Century Tourism (2009–present)
  Shanghai Bright Ubest (2018) (loaned)

Awards
 2013 FIVB U23 World Championship "Best Middle Blocker"

References

1992 births
Living people
Chinese women's volleyball players
Volleyball players from Zhejiang
Middle blockers
21st-century Chinese women